Song Mingqiong  (1750/52–1802), courtesy name Wanxian, was a Chinese poet of the Qing dynasty. She wrote thousands of poems during her lifetime, but perhaps only one-fifth of the poems have survived.

Biography
Song Mingqiong was from Beixiang, Fengxin, Jiangxi. The fifth of seven children of the scholar Song Wuren, she learned to read and write from her father and brothers. According to the local gazetteer (Fengxin xianzhi) she could read at the age of four, write poetry at the age of eight, and write fu prose-poems at the age of nine.

At the age of 14 she married Tu Jianxuan, also a native of Fengxin, and moved with him to Wenzhou when he took up an official position. Their marriage was cut short by his death seven years later. The next three decades saw her living out her life as a widow, bringing up a daughter and two adopted sons, and burying her parents and parents-in-law. Many of her days were spent reading poetry from her collection.

She often sent her poems to her siblings and their children, and it was through their connections that her poems enjoyed wide acclaim.

Dream of the Red Chamber poems
She was one of the earliest women to write poems reflecting on her reading of the novel Dream of the Red Chamber. Evidence exists that she published the four poems in 1791, when the novel was still banned by the Qing government. In these poems, she criticized traditional marriages and expressed support for free love.

All four poems have been translated into English by Ellen Widmer.

Bibliography
Weixue xuan shicao ("Poems from Weixue Pavilion", published in 1791)
Biegao ("Supplement")
Chunqiu waizhuan ("Ancillary to the Spring and Autumn Annals")

Her other poems are found in anthologies compiled by Cai Dianqi and Huang Zhimo.

References

External links
Chinese texts of Song Mingqiong's poems., McGill University

Year of birth missing
1802 deaths
18th-century Chinese poets
1750s births